Narragansett may refer to:

 Narragansett people, an indigenous people of Rhode Island, USA
 Narragansett language
 Narragansett Indian Tribe of Rhode Island, federally recognized tribe of Narragansett people

Animals
 Narragansett Pacer, a type of racehorse
 Narragansett Turkey

Places
 Narragansett, Rhode Island
 Narragansett Bay, Rhode Island Sound
 Narragansett Country, former name of what is now Washington County, Rhode Island
 Buxton, Maine, formerly called Narragansett Number 1

Transportation
 SS Narragansett, a passenger paddle steamer of the Stonington Line
 Narragansett-style excursion car, an open-air passenger rail car

Other
 Narragansett (soil), loamy soils occurring in the northeastern United States
 The Narragansett (Chicago), an apartment building on the National Register of Historic Places
 Narragansett Brewing Company, Rhode Island
 Narragansett High School, Narragansett, Rhode Island
 Narragansett Park, an American race track, Pawtucket, Rhode Island
 Narragansett Pier, a village within the town of Narragansett, Rhode Island 
 Narragansett Pond, a lake in Plymouth County, Massachusetts
 Narragansett Times, a newspaper in Narragansett and South Kingstown, Rhode Island
 Narragansett Trail, a public footpath in Connecticut and Rhode Island
 Judge Narragansett, a fictional character in the novel Atlas Shrugged

See also
 USS Narragansett (disambiguation)